The following lists events that happened during 1994 in Zaire.

Incumbents 
 President: Mobutu Sese Seko
 Prime Minister: Faustin Birindwa – Léon Kengo wa Dondo

Events

See also

 Zaire
 History of the Democratic Republic of the Congo

References

Sources

 
Zaire
Zaire